Lake Pointe Academy is a private, inter-denominationally Christian, college prep school. LPA operates on the University Model, which uses active parent involvement and a college-like format to build character, strong work ethic, and familiarity and competence in an alternating in-class and self-study schedule. Academics are based upon classical content and approaches to foster mastery, depth of thought, and engaged scholarship.

Location
Situated in northern York County near the shores of Lake Wylie, LPA serves students from the following metro-Charlotte counties:

York County, SC, (Rock Hill, Fort Mill, York, Clover, Lake Wyllie), 
Mecklenburg County, NC (Charlotte, Steele Creek), and
Gaston County (Gastonia, Belmont)

Athletics
LPA competes in the South Carolina Association of Christian Schools (SCACS), specifically in the Piedmont Region of the 2-A classification. They offer Cross Country, Volleyball, Basketball, Soccer, and Golf.

References

External links
 
 https://christianeducation.org/athletics/

Christian schools in South Carolina